The Way of the Animal Powers is the sixth studio album by Italian band Zu, released in 2005, within the collaboration of Fred Lonberg-Holm on cello. Originally released 2004 as a three band split CD Eccentrics, Issue #1 (Hinterlandt/Zu/Can Can Heads) by TenZenMen.

Track list
 Tom Araya Is Our Elvis
 Anatomy of a Lost Battle
 Shape Shifting
 The Aftermath
 Things Fall Apart
 The Witch Herbalist of Remote Town
 Farewell to the Species
 A Fortress Against Shadows
 Every Seagull Knows

References

Zu (band) albums
2005 albums